Castle Mountain is a peak in Banff National Park, Alberta, Canada.

Castle Mountain may also refer to:

Canada
Castle Mountain, Alberta or Castle Junction, a locality near the mountain in Banff
Castle Mountain Resort, near Pincher Creek, Alberta
Castle Mountain (British Columbia), a mountain in the Flathead Range, near Fernie

United States
Castle Mountain (Alaska), in the Wrangell Mountains
Castle Mountain (Carbon County, Montana), a mountain in the Beartooth Range
Castle Mountain (Hampshire County, West Virginia)
Castle Mountain (Pendleton County, West Virginia)
Castle Mountain (Washington), Cascade Range

See also
Castle Towers Mountain, near Garibaldi Lake, British Columbia, Canada
Schlossberg (disambiguation), for a number of articles named Castle Mountain in German